The 1995–96 Southern Football League season was the 93rd in the history of the league, an English football competition.

The Max Griggs-funded Rushden & Diamonds won the Premier Division and earned promotion to the Football Conference. Ilkeston Town, Stafford Rangers and VS Rugby were relegated to the Midland and Southern Divisions, whilst Nuneaton Borough, Sittingbourne, King's Lynn and Ashford Town (Kent) were promoted to the Premier Division, the former two as champions.

In the Midland Division, the bottom two clubs, Bury Town and Bridgnorth Town, were relegated to level eight leagues. Poole Town, who finished bottom of the Southern Division with just one point (from a 0–0 draw with Bashley) dropped two levels into the Hampshire League.

Premier Division
The Premier Division consisted of 22 clubs, including 16 clubs from the previous season and six new clubs:
Two clubs promoted from the Midland Division:
Ilkeston Town
Newport

Two clubs promoted from the Southern Division:
Baldock Town
Salisbury City

Two clubs relegated from the Football Conference:
Merthyr Tydfil
Stafford Rangers

League table

Midland Division
The Midland Division consisted of 22 clubs, including 18 clubs from the previous season and four new clubs:
Two clubs relegated from the Premier Division:
Corby Town
Solihull Borough

Plus:
Bury Town, transferred from the Southern Division
Paget Rangers, promoted from the Midland Alliance

League table

Southern Division
The Southern Division consisted of 22 clubs, including 17 clubs from the previous season and five new clubs:
Two clubs relegated from the Premier Division:
Sittingbourne
Trowbridge Town

Plus:
Cinderford Town, promoted from the Hellenic League
Fleet Town, promoted from the Wessex League
Forest Green Rovers, transferred from the Midland Division

League table

See also
Southern Football League
1995–96 Isthmian League
1995–96 Northern Premier League

References

Southern Football League seasons
6